Tahltan, or Goon-da-chagga or Goon-tdar-shaga ("where the spring water stops" in the Tahltan language,) is an unincorporated locality and Indian reserve community of the Tahltan people located east of Telegraph Creek in northern British Columbia, Canada, near the confluence of the Stikine and Tahltan Rivers.  The local First Nations government is the Tahltan Band Council.  The specific name of the Indian Reserve is Tahltan Indian Reserve No. 1.  Other reserves in the immediate vicinity, also governed by this band, are Tahltan Forks Indian Reserve No. 5, Upper Tahltan Indian Reserve No. 4 and Hiusta's Meadow Indian Reserve No. 2.

The name of the locality is from the Tlingit language and means "something heavy in the water", referring to salmon.  It was extended from this locality's name to apply to the Tahltan people.

See also
Iskut, British Columbia
Eddontenajon, British Columbia
Tahltan Indian Reserve No. 10

References

External links
Tahltan Band Council website history page

Populated places on the Stikine River
Unincorporated settlements in British Columbia
Tahltan
Stikine Country